"Sixty Eight Guns" is a song by Welsh rock band the Alarm that was released as a single in August 1983 and later appeared on the group's debut album Declaration in February 1984. It was written by Alarm members Mike Peters and Eddie MacDonald.

The song reached #17 on the UK Singles Chart, becoming the Alarm's first Top 40 appearance and their highest-ever position on that chart. The song also reached #39 on the Hot Mainstream Rock Tracks chart in the United States, the Alarm's first-ever chart position in that country. Soon after, it "bubbled under" the Billboard Hot 100 singles chart at #106, becoming the band's first charting single on the American pop charts.

The song was recorded at Good Earth Studios and mixed at Abbey Road Studios.

Background and writing

The lyrics to "Sixty Eight Guns" were inspired by a book that Peters had read about the 1960s street gangs of Glasgow.

Title 
The song's title is written as "Sixty Eight (sic) Guns" and "68 Guns" interchangeably on the various I.R.S. releases. The back cover of Declaration and the front cover of the 7" single show the title as "Sixty Eight Guns" while the labels on the discs themselves show the title as "68 Guns".

Track listing
All songs written by Mike Peters and Eddie MacDonald.

UK 7" Single
"68 Guns" - 3:15
"68 Guns Part II" - 3:25

UK 12" Single
"68 Guns (Full Version)" - 5:45
"Thoughts of a Young Man" - 2:50

Credits
 Vocals - Mike Peters
 Guitars - Dave Sharp, Mike Peters
 Bass - Eddie MacDonald
 Drums - Nigel Twist
 Keyboards - Ian Kewley
 Piano - Alan Shacklock
 Trumpet - Arthur Fairlie
 Single cover -  Harry Murlowski

Charts

Other releases
The song appeared on several other Alarm releases:

 As a live track on the maxi-version of the single "Spirit of '76".
 As a live studio version on the "45 RPM" hoax single released by the Alarm under the name of the Poppy Fields.
 As a live track on Peters' solo Live (From a Broadcast) album. It includes an additional verse that was dropped during the early stages of writing.

Notes

External links
 The Alarm official website

1983 songs
1983 singles
I.R.S. Records singles
The Alarm songs